Lewis Carmichael (born 1995) is a former Scotland international rugby union player who last played for  Edinburgh Rugby in the Pro14. 

At the conclusion of the 2020–21 Pro14 season Carmichael announced his retirement from professional rugby on medical advice at the age of 26.

Rugby Union career

Amateur career

He won the 2014 RBS Premiership title with Melrose.

Professional career

He played for Edinburgh Rugby in the Pro14.

International career

Carmichael received his first senior cap against Canada on the 9 June 2018. He scored a try on his debut.

References

External links 
 Edinburgh Rugby player bio

1995 births
Living people
Scottish rugby union players
Rugby union locks
Rugby union players from Edinburgh
People educated at North Berwick High School
Edinburgh Rugby players
Scotland international rugby union players
Melrose RFC players
Scotland Club XV international rugby union players
Western Force players